Alan England Brooke, D.D. (1 September1863 – 29 October 1939) was an English academic.

Brooke was born in Pembrokeshire and educated at Eton College. He entered King's College, Cambridge in 1883, graduating B.A in 1886 and M.A  in 1890. He was Fellow of Kings from 1889 to 1926; and Provost of King's College, Cambridge from 1926 to 1933. Brooke was ordained a priest in the Church of England in 1904. After a curacy at Gayton he was Ely Professor of Divinity from 1916 to 1926, and Canon of Ely during the same period. He was an Honorary Chaplain to the King from 1918 until his death.

References

People educated at Eton College
Provosts of King's College, Cambridge
Fellows of King's College, Cambridge
Alumni of King's College, Cambridge
1863 births
1939 deaths
People from Pembrokeshire
20th-century English Anglican priests
Honorary Chaplains to the King
Ely Professors of Divinity